is a form of traditional Japanese narrative music in which a  sings to the accompaniment of a .  accompanies , traditional Japanese puppet theater. As a form of storytelling,  emphasizes the lyrics and narration rather than the music itself. 

Following this event, every tale sung to the accompaniment of a  became emblematic of the  style.

See also 
 

Japanese styles of music
Japanese traditional music
Japanese words and phrases
Shamisen